Zinc finger protein 780A is a protein that in humans is encoded by the ZNF780A gene.

References